Dotzauer like the spelling variant Totzauer is a Sudeten German toponymic surname for an inhabitant of Totzau, a small village in northern Bohemia that was abandoned and destroyed in 1946. Notable people with the surname include:
Daniel Dotzauer (born 1991), German figure skater
Friedrich Dotzauer (1783–1860), German cellist and composer
Richard Dotzauer (1816–1887), Czech politician and entrepreneur
Uwe Dotzauer (born 1959), East German nordic combined skier

References

German-language surnames